George Henry "Pye" Lewis (11 August 1909 - 23 September 1994) was an Australian rules footballer who played with Footscray in the Victorian Football League (VFL).

Notes

External links 
		

1909 births
1994 deaths
Australian rules footballers from Victoria (Australia)
Western Bulldogs players